or problematica is a term used for a taxonomic group where its broader relationships are unknown or undefined. Alternatively, such groups are frequently referred to as "enigmatic taxa".

Examples 
The fossil plant Paradinandra suecica could not be assigned to any family, but was placed incertae sedis within the order Ericales when described in 2001.
 The fossil Gluteus minimus, described in 1975, could not be assigned to any known animal phylum. The genus is therefore incertae sedis within the kingdom Animalia.
 While it was unclear to which order the New World vultures (family Cathartidae) should be assigned, they were placed in Aves incertae sedis. It was later agreed to place them in a separate order, Cathartiformes.
Bocage's longbill, Motacilla bocagii, previously known as Amaurocichla bocagii, is a species of passerine bird that belongs to the superfamily Passeroidea. Since it was unclear to which family it belongs, it was classified as Passeroidea incertae sedis, until a 2015 phylogenetic study placed it in Motacilla of Motacillidae.
Parakaryon myojinensis, a single-celled organism that is apparently distinct from prokaryotes and eukaryotes.

In formal nomenclature
When formally naming a taxon, uncertainty about its taxonomic classification can be problematic. The International Code of Nomenclature for algae, fungi, and plants, stipulates that "species and subdivisions of genera must be assigned to genera, and infraspecific taxa must be assigned to species, because their names are combinations", but ranks higher than the genus may be assigned incertae sedis.

Reason for use

Poor description
This excerpt from a 2007 scientific paper about crustaceans of the Kuril–Kamchatka Trench and the Japan Trench describes typical circumstances through which this category is applied in discussing:
...the removal of many genera from new and existing families into a state of incertae sedis. Their reduced status was attributed largely to poor or inadequate descriptions but it was accepted that some of the vagueness in the analysis was due to insufficient character states. It is also evident that a proportion of the characters used in the analysis, or their given states for particular taxa, were inappropriate or invalid. Additional complexity, and factors that have misled earlier authorities, are intrusion by extensive homoplasies, apparent character state reversals and convergent evolution.

Not included in an analysis
If a formal phylogenetic analysis is conducted that does not include a certain taxon, the authors might choose to label the taxon incertae sedis instead of guessing its placement. This is particularly common when molecular phylogenies are generated, since tissue for many rare organisms is hard to obtain. It is also a common scenario when fossil taxa are included, since many fossils are defined based on partial information. For example, if the phylogeny was constructed using soft tissue and vertebrae as principal characters and the taxon in question is only known from a single tooth, it would be necessary to label it incertae sedis.

Controversy 
If conflicting results exist or if there is not a consensus among researchers as to how a taxon relates to other organisms, it may be listed as incertae sedis until the conflict is resolved.

Other ways of denoting uncertainty 
Uncertain taxonomic assigations of other degrees may be denoted using the 'cf.' (before a taxon name) and '?' (after a taxon name) specifiers.

In zoological nomenclature 
In zoological nomenclature, "incertae sedis" is not a nomenclatural term at all per se, but is used by taxonomists in their classifications to mean "of uncertain taxonomic position".Glossary In botany, a name is not validly published if it is not accepted by the author in the same publication.Article 36.1 In zoology, a name proposed conditionally may be available under certain conditions.Articles 11 and 15 For uncertainties at lower levels, some authors have proposed a system of "open nomenclature", suggesting that question marks be used to denote a questionable assignment. For example, if a new species was given the specific epithet album by Anton and attributed with uncertainty to Agenus, it could be denoted "Agenus? album Anton (?Anton)"; the "(?Anton)" indicates the author that assigned the question mark. So if Anton described Agenus album, and Bruno called the assignment into doubt, this could be denoted "Agenus? album (Anton) (?Bruno)", with the parentheses around Anton because the original assignment (to Agenus) was modified (to Agenus?) by Bruno. This practice is not included in the International Code of Zoological Nomenclature, and is used only by paleontologists.

See also
 Glossary of scientific naming
 Nomen dubium, a name of unknown or doubtful application
 Species inquirenda, a species that in the opinion of the taxonomist requires further investigation
 Wastebasket taxon
 Sui generis (biology)
 Unclassified language

References

External links 
 
 

 
Biological nomenclature
Taxonomy (biology)
Zoological nomenclature